Public opinion is the aggregate of individual attitudes or beliefs held by the adult population. 

Public opinion may also refer to:

Film and television
 Public Opinion (1916 film), an American silent film
 Public Opinion (1935 film), an American film directed by Frank R. Strayer
 Public Opinion (1954 film), a French-Italian drama film
 Public Opinion (TV series), a 2004 British panel game

Periodicals
 Public Opinion (Chambersburg), a morning newspaper covering the Greater Chambersburg area, Pennsylvania, US
 Public Opinion (magazine), an 1861–1951 British weekly
 Public Opinion Quarterly, an academic journal of the American Association for Public Opinion Research
 Watertown Public Opinion, a daily newspaper in Watertown, South Dakota, US

Other uses
 Public Opinion (book), a 1922 book by Walter Lippmann
 Public Opinion, a character in Jacques Offenbach's operetta Orpheus in the Underworld

See also
 Institute of Public Opinion, a public opinion poll institute